Jordan Schmaltz (born October 8, 1993) is an American professional ice hockey defenseman who is currently playing for EHC Kloten in the Swiss National League (NL). He was drafted 25th overall by the St. Louis Blues in the 2012 NHL Entry Draft.

Playing career
Schmaltz played collegiate hockey with the University of North Dakota after playing in the United States Hockey League (USHL) with the Green Bay Gamblers, where he won the 2012 Clark and Anderson Cups. He also received First-Team honors of the USHL. In 2011, he was traded to the Gamblers from the Sioux City Musketeers, where he was named to the 2010–11 USHL All-Rookie Team and also to the USHL First All-Star Team.

Schmaltz spent three seasons playing for the University of North Dakota in the National Collegiate Hockey Conference (NCHC). On May 28, 2015, he announced that he would forgo his final year of NCAA eligibility and signed a three-year, entry-level contract with the St. Louis Blues. He made his NHL debut in a 3–0 win over the Colorado Avalanche on March 5, 2017.

On December 12, 2017, Schmaltz was recalled to the Blues to replace injured captain Alex Pietrangelo. Schmaltz was selected for the 2018 AHL All-Star Game but was unavailable to play. He was replaced by Tucson Roadrunners' defenseman Kyle Capobianco.

On September 13, 2018, Schmaltz signed a two-year contract extension with the Blues.

On July 25, 2019, Schmaltz was traded to the Toronto Maple Leafs in exchange for Andreas Borgman. In the following 2019–20 season, Schmaltz recorded 2 goals and 13 points in 37 games with the Maple Leafs' AHL affiliate, the Toronto Marlies, before he was traded by the Maple Leafs at the NHL trade deadline to the New York Islanders in exchange for Matt Lorito on February 24, 2020. Schmaltz made six appearances with the Bridgeport Sound Tigers before the season was cancelled due to the COVID-19 pandemic.

As a free agent from the Islanders, Schmaltz went unsigned during the break. Approaching the delayed 2020–21 season, Schmaltz accepted a professional tryout invitation to attend the Arizona Coyotes training camp, joining his brother Nick, on December 28, 2020. After his release by the Coyotes following training camp, Schmaltz was Tucson Roadrunners on a professional tryout contract.

After six North American professional seasons, Schmaltz opted to sign abroad as a free agent, joining Finnish club, HIFK of the Liiga, on June 16, 2021.

International play

Schmaltz was a member of the gold medal-winning United States team at the 2010 World Junior A Challenge.

Personal life
Schmaltz is the son of Mike and Lisa Schmaltz. He is the older brother of Nick Schmaltz, who was selected 20th overall by the Chicago Blackhawks in the 2014 NHL Entry Draft. He also has a younger sister, Kylie who plays volleyball for the University of Kentucky.

Schmaltz attending the University of North Dakota and majored in Communication and Social Science.  His father and two uncles, Marc and Monte, also attended college there, and lettered in football.

Career statistics

Regular season and playoffs

International

Awards and honors

References

External links
 

1993 births
Living people
American men's ice hockey defensemen
Bridgeport Sound Tigers players
Chicago Wolves players
Green Bay Gamblers players
HIFK (ice hockey) players
EHC Kloten players
National Hockey League first-round draft picks
North Dakota Fighting Hawks men's ice hockey players
San Antonio Rampage players
Sioux City Musketeers players
St. Louis Blues draft picks
St. Louis Blues players
Toronto Marlies players
Tucson Roadrunners players
Sportspeople from Madison, Wisconsin
Ice hockey players from Wisconsin